Middletown station is an at-grade station on the Blue Line and Green Line of the San Diego Trolley system. It is located along the Surf Line right of way at West Palm Street, in the Middletown neighborhood of San Diego, which includes a variety of medium-density housing within blocks of the station. The station offers a connection to the San Diego International Airport via a shuttle stop one block away from this station.

This station opened on June 16, 1996 as part of the North/South Line (later renamed the Blue Line) extension to the Old Town Transit Center. The station was closed from May 21 through August 2012 for renovations as part of the Trolley Renewal Project.

Station layout
There are four tracks, two for the trolley station and two passing tracks for commuter, intercity, and BNSF freight service.

Airport Connection
San Diego International Airport is accessible from this station. In July 2015, the airport added its "TROLLEY → TERMINAL" shuttle service that adds a stop near this station to buses that operate the terminals and the airport's consolidated rental car center, which opened January 20, 2016.

See also
 List of San Diego Trolley stations

References

Blue Line (San Diego Trolley)
Green Line (San Diego Trolley)
Railway stations in the United States opened in 1996
San Diego Trolley stations in San Diego
1996 establishments in California